The Embassy of Finland in Stockholm is Finland's diplomatic mission in Sweden. It is located at Gärdesgatan 11 in the district of Gärdet. The current ambassador of Finland to Sweden, since 2018, is Liisa Talonpoika who is also the first female ever to hold this position.

Ambassadors

See also
 Foreign relations of Finland
 Finland–Sweden relations
 List of Ambassadors of Finland to Sweden

References

External links
 Embassy of Finland in Stockholm

Buildings and structures in Stockholm
Sweden
Stockholm
Finland–Sweden relations